Madanpur Khadar is an urban village in South East district of Delhi. It is located on Delhi-UP Border and is an 800 years old village, named after Thakur Madan Singh Chauhan. The term Khadar is attached to the village’s name because it is situated on the banks of Yamuna river. It was declared as an urban village by the administrative authorities under Delhi Metropolitan Council in 1966.

History

Madanpur Khadar is an 800 years old village which takes its name from Thakur Madan Singh Chauhan. His ancestors were warriors in Samrat Prithviraj Chauhan’s army. Few family members of Thakur Madan Singh left the village around 600 years back and went to Garh Ganga & Haridwar to settle there. Gurjars who were mostly cow grazers at that time in the nearby areas were brought here around 300 years back and Land was given to them.

Demographics 

 The original and biggest mohalla is CHAUHAN mohalla of Rajput community. This mohalla is further divided into Ram Singh Thok, Mansukh Thok, Basau and Gangwalias.
 Four small mohalla of Gurjar Community : Churiya, Bhangar, Haddu and Mehla

Administration

Madanpur Khadar village comes under the jurisdiction of South East Delhi.
The Sub Division is Sarita Vihar while its office is situated in Amar Colony and the DCP office is in Sarita Vihar. Police Station Sarita Vihar have jurisdiction over Madanpur Khadar Village.

Governance

 Madanpur Khadar Village comes under Madanpur Khadar West - ward 186, The Councillor is Shri Braham Singh Bidhuri.
 In Delhi Legislative assembly, Madanpur Khadar Village comes under Okhla Assembly of Delhi Vidhansabha. MLA is Amanatullah Khan.
 In Loksabha, Madanpur Khadar village comes under East Delhi Loksabha. Gautam Gambhir is the Member of Parliament from this area

Educational institutions

 D.A.V Public School, Jasola
 GD Goenka School, Sarita Vihar
 Government Boys Senior Secondary school, Madanpur Khadar
 Government Girls Senior Secondary School, Madanpur Khadar
 Rama Krishna Government Sarvodaya Bal Vidyalaya, Madanpur Khadar
 Saint Giri Public School, Sarita Vihar
 Sarvodaya Kanya Vidyalya, Madanpur Khadar
 SDMC Boys Primary School, Madanpur Khadar
 SDMC Girls Primary School, Madanpur Khadar

Hospitals
 All India Institute of Ayurveda, Delhi The AIIAD project completed in 2016, AIIA was Inaugurated by Prime Minister Narendra Modi.
 Apollo Hospital, Indraprastha .
 Fortis Escorts Heart Institute.
 Holy Family Hospital are some of the hospitals located within the radius of 5 km of the village.

 MCW Madanpur Khadar - Mother and Child Welfare Centre, Madanpur Khadar
 MCD Allopathic Dispensary, Madanpur Khadar
 Veterinary Hospital, Madanpur Khadar
Construction of a 350 Bed Government Hospital has started in K&L Block of Sarita Vihar

Future Projects
DND–KMP Expressway - In March 2019 Union minister for road transport and highways Nitin Gadkari  laid the foundation stone for a 59-km six-lane DND–KMP Expressway national highway connecting New Delhi’s Ring Road with the under-construction Delhi-Mumbai Expressway.
The highway alignment was announced by the Centre in May, 2018. The access-controlled highway project will start at the Ring Road-DND junction passing through the Kalindi Kunj, Madanpur Khadar Village, Aali Village, Meethapur Chowk and Faridabad-Ballabhgarh bypass, and will finish at the interchange of the Delhi-Mumbai Expressway at the Western Peripheral Expressway or Kundli-Manesar–Palwal (KMP) Expressway this Project is going to further enhance the appeal of Madanpur Khadar Village

Religious places

 Ganga Mandi
 Kalkaji Mandir
 Kheda Devta Mandir - This is Gram Devta, the villagers worship it on auspicious and festive days. 
 Radha Krishna Mandir
 Shiv Mandir, Madanpur Khadar - This is the oldest temple not only in the village but also around the whole area.

Public transportation
Madanpur Khadar Village is situated at a Prime location of South East Delhi having as in East Direction DND-KMP Expressway, in West Direction Delhi-Mathura Highway, In North Noida Kalindi Kunj Road. It is at Border of Uttar Pradesh and Haryana. People Can travel to Noida and Faridabad In just 10 Minutes.

Nearest Metro Station :
 Sarita Vihar (Delhi Metro) Station on Violet Line
 Jasola - Shaheen Bagh (Delhi Metro) Station on Magenta Line.
 Kalindi Kunj (Delhi Metro) Station on Magenta Line.
Delhi Transport Corporation (DTC) buses which pass from Madanpur Khadar Village are:
 460 (Badarpur Border - Minto Road)
 405 (Badarpur Border - Old Delhi Railway Station)
 479 (Badarpur Border - Punjabi Bagh)
 34 (Mehrauli - Noida Sector 37) 
 8 (Badarpur Border  - Noida Phase II)
 404 (Madanpur Khadar Village - Mori Gate)
 465 (Madanpur Khadar Extension  - Safdarjung Terminal)
 473 (Badarpur Border  - Anand vihar Terminal)
 422 (Badarpur Border  - Kashmiri Gate)

Notable people

 Boxer Gaurav Bidhuri hails from Madanpur Khadar Village

See also
 Tughlakabad (village)
 Tehkhand
 Khizrabad Village
 Old Pillanji Village

References

Villages in South East District Delhi